The 1988 Taipei Women's Championships was a women's tennis tournament played on indoor carpet courts in Taipei, Taiwan and was part of the Category 1 tier of the 1988 Virginia Slims World Championship Series. It was the third edition of the tournament and was held from April 18th through April 24th 1988. Third-seeded Stephanie Rehe won the singles title.

Finals

Singles

 Stephanie Rehe defeated  Brenda Schultz 6–4, 6–4
 It was Rehe's 1st singles title of the year and the 4th of her career.

Doubles

 Patty Fendick /  Ann Henricksson defeated  Belinda Cordwell /  Julie Richardson 6–2, 2–6, 6–2
 It was Fendick's 5th title of the year and the 5th of her career. It was Henricksson's 2nd title of the year and the 2nd of her career.

References

External links
 ITF tournament edition details
 Tournament draws

Taipei Women's Championship
Taipei Women's Championship
1988 in Taiwanese tennis